Merchant Tower (formerly known as Merchant's Hotel) is a historic structure in Campbellsville, Kentucky, United States.  Built in 1910, it is listed as Merchant's Hotel on the National Register of Historic Places and is a part of the Campbellsville Historic Commercial District.

It is a three-story building built as a hotel, which later served as a rooming house.

References

External links
Merchant Tower website
Downtown Campbellsville

Hotel buildings on the National Register of Historic Places in Kentucky
Hotel buildings completed in 1910
National Register of Historic Places in Taylor County, Kentucky
Campbellsville, Kentucky
1910 establishments in Kentucky
Individually listed contributing properties to historic districts on the National Register in Kentucky